The United States Drug Enforcement Administration (DEA) maintains lists regarding the classification of illicit drugs (see DEA Schedules). It also maintains List I of chemicals and List II of chemicals, which contain chemicals that are used to manufacture the controlled substances/illicit drugs. The list is designated within the Controlled Substances Act but can be modified by the U.S. Attorney General as illegal manufacturing practices change.

Although the list is controlled by the Attorney General, the list is considered a DEA list because the DEA publishes and enforces the list.

Suppliers of these products are subject to regulation and control measures:

List I chemicals
These chemicals are designated as those that are used in the manufacture of the controlled substances and are important to the manufacture of the substances:

List II chemicals
These chemicals are designated as those that are used in the manufacture of controlled substances:

Special Surveillance List

Chemicals
All listed chemicals as specified in 21 CFR 1310.02 (a) or (b). This includes supplements which contain a listed chemical, regardless of their dosage form or packaging and regardless of whether the chemical mixture, drug product or dietary supplement is exempt from regulatory controls. For each chemical, its illicit manufacturing use is given in parentheses. Some Special Surveillance List chemicals do not have an exclusive manufacturing use for a specific illicit drug but rather have a broad range of uses in both legitimate and illicit manufacturing operations.

Equipment
The equipment list:
 Hydrogenators
 Tableting machines
 Encapsulating machines
 22-liter heating mantles

References

External links
 DEA Controlled Substance Schedules

See also
 Drug precursors
 European law on drug precursors
 Combat Methamphetamine Epidemic Act of 2005
 Chemical Diversion and Trafficking Act

Drug Enforcement Administration
Chemistry-related lists
Drug control law in the United States
Regulation of chemicals
Regulation in the United States